The Shanghai Greenway is a greenway in Shanghai, China. It consists of many sections of marked paths lined with landscaped foliage passing through several urban parks. 

The Changning section runs from South to North along the outer ring road close to Hongqiao Airport. The Greenway then runs East to West along the Suzhou Creek starting with the new, specially-constructed Linkong Music Park running almost uninterrupted to the Waibaidu Bridge by The Bund.

There is a section along the Huangpu River which has pedestrian, cycling and mixed stretches.

There are sections of Greenway in Pudong, Baoshan, Putuo, Jiading, Minhang, Xuhui and Changning Districts, which follow the route of the Outer Ring Road and connect together to form a continuous 112-kilometer loop.

References 

Greenways
Parks in Shanghai
Tourist attractions in Shanghai
Transport in Shanghai
Urban public parks in China